Maddington is a suburb 20 kilometres (12 mi) southeast of the central business district of Perth, the capital of Western Australia, within the City of Gosnells local government area. Maddington is a mixed-use suburb containing major residential, retail and industrial sections as well as some semi-rural areas.

Unusual amongst the surrounding suburbs Maddington still retains several vineyards and orchards from when the locality was used for agricultural purposes.  Maddington has a railway station and like numerous other centres, has been engaging in transit-oriented development planning.

History 
During the 19th century, Maddington was owned by John Randall Phillips, one of the wealthier colonists to arrive in Perth during the 1830s. Maddington Park, which Phillips named after a town in Wiltshire, England, was subdivided 70 years later as Perth dealt with the population explosion following the gold rush. Maddington Park became "Maddington" – an area of varied agricultural uses including market gardens, poultry and orchards. In the 1950s and 1960s, Maddington and surrounding suburbs were further subdivided and developed into residential suburbs.

During the 1960s the Canning Park race course, located in Maddington, was abandoned. William Davison, an English property developer bought up the land and developed the area into an industrial estate, which is the light industrial area which can be seen along Albany Highway and the train line today. The suburb also was the site of one of 24 new Australian Technical Colleges proposed by the Howard Government in 2005.

Maddington Central
Formerly known as Centro Maddington and Maddington Metro, the centre was built in two stages from the early 1980s to 1992. Main tenants include Coles, Woolworths, Kmart and Best & Less. Other stores include Bankwest, ANZ, Red Dot stores, NAB, Telstra shop, numerous small shops in the food court and the Maddington post office.

Maddington Central is located 20 kilometres from the Perth central business district between Olga Road, Burslem Drive and Attfield Street in Maddington. It is also accessible by public transport.

Gallery

References

External links 
 Maddington / Kenwick Sustainable Development Prospectus
 Maddington Town Centre

Suburbs of Perth, Western Australia
Suburbs in the City of Gosnells